Justin Apostol (14 September 1921 – 31 January 1991) was a Romanian footballer who played as a goalkeeper.

International career
Justin Apostol played three games at international level for Romania, including two matches at the 1948 Balkan Cup.

Honours
Gloria CFR Galați
Divizia B: 1938–39
UTA Arad
Divizia A: 1946–47

Notes

References

External links

1921 births
1991 deaths
Romanian footballers
Romania international footballers
Association football goalkeepers
Liga I players
Liga II players
Gloria CFR Galați players
FC UTA Arad players
CSM Jiul Petroșani players
FC Rapid București players
Sportspeople from Galați